Alpha (Α or α) and omega (Ω or ω) are the first and last letters of the Greek alphabet, and  a title of Christ and God in the Book of Revelation. This pair of letters is used as a Christian symbol, and is often combined with the Cross, Chi-rho, or other Christian symbols.

Origin
The first written record of the phrase "alpha and omega" is from some old manuscripts of the Christian New Testament.

The phrase "I am the Alpha and the Omega" (Koiné Greek: "ἐγώ εἰμί τὸ Ἄλφα καὶ τὸ Ὦ"), is an appellation of Jesus and of the Father in the Book of Revelation (verses 1:8, 21:6, and 22:13).   The first part of this phrase ("I am the Alpha and the Omega") is first found in Chapter 1 verse 8 ("1:8"), and is found in every manuscript of Revelation that has 1:8. Several later manuscripts repeat "I am the Alpha and the Omega" in 1:11 too, but do not receive support here from most of the oldest manuscripts, including the Alexandrine, Sinaitic, and Codex Ephraemi Rescriptus. It is, therefore, omitted in some modern translations. Scholar Robert Young stated, with regard to "I am the Alpha and the Omega" in 1:11, the "oldest [manuscripts] omit" it.

A similar reference is in Isaiah 44, where the Father says to be the first and the one who is after all.

Christianity
Alpha (Α) and omega (Ω) are the first and last letters, respectively, of the classical (Ionic) Greek alphabet. Thus, the phrase "I am the alpha and the omega" is further clarified with the additional phrase, "the beginning and the end" in Revelation 21:6, 22:13. The first and last letters of the Greek alphabet were used because the book of Revelation is in the New Testament, which was originally written in Greek.

This phrase is interpreted by many Christians to mean that Jesus has existed for all eternity or that God is eternal. Many commentators and dictionaries ascribe the title "the alpha and the omega"  to both God and to Christ. Barnes' Notes on the New Testament (1974) claims: "It cannot be absolutely certain that the writer meant to refer to the Lord Jesus specifically here ... There is no real incongruity in supposing, also, that the writer here meant to refer to God as such." Most Christian denominations also teach that the title applies to God (Jesus, the Father and the Holy Spirit).

The letters Alpha and Omega, in juxtaposition, are often used as a Christian visual symbol (see examples). The symbols were used in early Christianity and appear in the Roman catacombs. The letters were shown hanging from the arms of the cross in Early Christian art, and some cruces gemmatae, jeweled crosses in precious metal, have formed letters hanging in this way, called pendilia; for example, in the Asturian coat of arms, which is based upon the Asturian Victory Cross. In fact, despite always being in Greek, the letters became more common in Western than Eastern Orthodox Christian art.  They are often shown to the left and right of Christ's head, sometimes within his halo, where they take the place of the Christogram used in Orthodox art.

Judaism
In Hebrew, the word emet  (אמת, meaning "truth"), is referred to as the "Seal of God." [Cf.  Isaiah 44:6] The word is composed of the first, middle, and last letters of the Hebrew alphabet.

Islam
The Qur'an gives al-ʾAwwal (ٱلْأَوَّل), meaning "The First" and al-ʾĀkhir (ٱلْآخِر), meaning "The Last" as two of the names of God: .

APL programming language

Some dialects of the APL programming language support the direct function syntax where the left (optional) and right arguments are denoted by the letters alpha and omega. For example, the following function computes the sum of the left argument and twice the right argument:
{⍺+2×⍵}

See also 
Alpha and Omega (disambiguation)
Alpha et Omega 
Attributes of God in Christianity
Chi Rho
Christian symbolism
Everything
Names and titles of Jesus in the New Testament
Names of God in Islam
Names of God in Judaism

References

External links

"Alpha and Omega (in Scripture)" in the Catholic Encyclopedia at newadvent.org
"Alpha and Omega" at the Jewish Encyclopedia

Biblical phrases
Book of Revelation
Christian symbols
Christian terminology
Greek words and phrases
Greek letters
Language and mysticism
Heraldic charges
Names of God in Christianity
New Testament words and phrases
Superlatives in religion